Hong Zhang is an electrical engineer from the University of Alberta in Edmonton. He was named a Fellow of the Institute of Electrical and Electronics Engineers (IEEE) in 2014 for his contributions to collective robotics and intelligent sensing in oil sand mining.

References

Fellow Members of the IEEE
Living people
Year of birth missing (living people)
Place of birth missing (living people)
Academic staff of the University of Alberta